I Want to Be a Chorus Girl (Spanish:Yo quiero ser bataclana) is a 1941 Argentine musical comedy film directed by Manuel Romero and starring Niní Marshall, Juan Carlos Thorry and Alicia Barrié.

The film's art direction was by Ricardo J. Conord.

Cast
 Niní Marshall as Catita 
 Juan Carlos Thorry as Carlos  
 Alicia Barrié as Julia Reyes  
 Sabina Olmos as Elena  
 Enrique Roldán as Jorge 
 Segundo Pomar as Don Pepet  
 Roberto Blanco as Linares 
 Rosa Martín as Susy  
 Estela Taylor as Emilia  
 Mercedes Quintana as herself  
 Juan D'Arienzo as himself

References

Bibliography 
 Adrián Pérez Melgosa. Cinema and Inter-American Relations: Tracking Transnational Affect. Routledge, 2012.

External links 
 

1941 films
1941 musical comedy films
1940s Spanish-language films
Films directed by Manuel Romero
Argentine musical comedy films
Argentine black-and-white films
1940s Argentine films